Krossen is a village in Lindesnes municipality in Agder county, Norway.

The village (also known as Holum) was the administrative centre of the old municipality of Holum which existed from 1838 until its dissolution in 1964. Holum Church, built in 1825, is located in Krossen.

References

Villages in Agder
Lindesnes